The 2002 Gloucester City Council election took place on 2 May 2002 to elect members of Gloucester City Council in England. There were boundary changes within Gloucester with Quedgeley being added to Gloucester and became a No Overall Control council, previously Labour-led.

Results  

|}

Ward results

Abbey

Barnwood

Barton and Tredworth

Elmbridge

Grange

Hucclecote

Kingsholm and Wotton

Longlevens

Matson and Robinswood

Moreland

Podsmead

Quedgeley Fieldcourt

Quedgeley Severn Vale

Tuffley

Westgate

References

2002 English local elections
2002
2000s in Gloucestershire